Amy Moritz Ridenour (November 9, 1959 – March 31, 2017), was president of the National Center for Public Policy Research, a Washington, DC conservative think tank.  Ridenour held this post from the organization's founding in 1982 until her death. She wrote a syndicated op-ed column from 1997 and was a frequent radio and television guest.

Background

According to Nina Easton's Gang of Five, Amy Moritz was a veteran organizer of the College Republican National Committee. She was a candidate in 1981 for election as national chairman of the organization, opposed by Jack Abramoff.

Abramoff, Ralph Reed, and Grover Norquist persuaded Moritz to drop out of the race by promising her the appointed position of executive director. With the only serious competitor out of the way, Abramoff won the election easily.

Although Moritz was later rebuffed by the "Abramoff-Norquist-Reed triumvirate" and only given the titular position of "deputy director", she continued to work with - group and became a good friend of Norquist. Abramoff would also later become a director of the National Center for Public Policy Research (NCPPR).

Moritz later married fellow College Republican David A. Ridenour.

National Center for Public Policy Research
Ridenour was a founding chief executive officer of the NCPPR in 1982. The NCPPR claims to promote "the conservative and free market perspective on US domestic, foreign and defense policy issues." Ridenour's husband David A. Ridenour is vice president of the organization.

NCPPR bulletins have been heavily cited by conservative members of Congress, sometimes apparently being copied entirely with little more than a change in letterhead.

Pro-tobacco, anti-environmental positions

During the national tobacco litigation, a memo from Philip Morris executive Frank Gomez revealed that Ridenour (under her maiden name of Amy Moritz) had offered "to use any information we can provide re the current anti-tobacco onslaught..." Ridenour wrote many op-eds attacking the filing of lawsuits by state attorneys general against tobacco firms and on tobacco policies, such as "Ironies of the Tobacco Wars," "Federal Tobacco Lawsuit Could Pave Way for Litigation Tax on Other Industries," "Latin America Go Home: Tobacco Policies in Foreign Countries Should Be Made by Foreign Countries, Not in U.S. Courts" and "Lawyers' Fees in Tobacco Case Should Be Capped."  Ridenour said that such lawsuits were improper, that regulation of tobacco was the province of legislatures, not law enforcement, and that private attorneys were using the suits to enrich themselves by many millions of dollars.

Environmentalists also claimed articles by Ridenour skeptical of the global warming theory were written only because NCPPR received support from ExxonMobil. Ridenour, writing on her blog, countered that her writing on the issue began in 1992, predating by many years her institution's receipt of any funding from fossil fuel industries.  She also claimed that total fossil fuel funding of NCPPR in 2004 amounted to six-tenths of one percent of her organization's total funding.  An examination of ExxonMobil grant reports in 2011 on the ExxonMobil website showed NCPPR had not received any grants from ExxonMobil for at least several years.

Abramoff connections

Support for Abramoff clients
In a series of editorials between 1999 and 2001, Ridenour attacked efforts to expand federal immigration laws to the Commonwealth of the Marianas Islands, defended the islands' meager wages, and attacked Clinton Administration attempts to tighten labor laws.  Ridenour also lent her support to the Western Pacific Economic Council, a trade group composed of Marianas garment manufacturers. Her group’s name appeared in a Saipan newspaper backing the Council in 1999.

Both the Marianas and the Economic Council were clients of Jack Abramoff at the time. The Marianas paid Abramoff’s firm Preston Gates $1.9 million in 1999 and 2000 and his second firm, Greenberg Traurig, $1.1 million in 2001. The Western Pacific Economic Council paid Preston Gates $2.3 million in 1999 and 2000.

In August 2001, Ridenour wrote an editorial in the Washington Times, "The U.S. Must Tread Carefully to Avoid Creating More Fundamentalist Islamic Governments," warning of the dangerous possibility that Malaysia could become a third Iran or Afghanistan, with what she called "ferocious and fanatical hatred aimed against the West generally and the United States in particular" and in the case of Afghanistan sheltering "the world's most notorious - and dangerous - international terrorist, Osama bin Laden."  She warned about Islamic fundamentalist support for Anwar Ibrahim, the main political rival of Abramoff’s then-client, Malaysian Prime Minister Mahathir bin Mohamed. Of Malaysia, she wrote, "in recent years Malaysia has made extraordinary strides in its development as a prosperous, stable and democratic state" but "its levels of economic freedom, regulations on trade and limits on private property rights led the Heritage Foundation to conclude in 2001 that its economy is 'mostly unfree.'" Abramoff was paid $1.2 million to arrange a meeting between the Prime Minister and President Bush.

Funding of Abramoff-sponsored trips
Ridenour has come under fire for allegedly using the NCPPR as a clearinghouse for clients of convicted lobbyist Jack Abramoff to pay for a luxurious golf trip to St. Andrew's in Scotland, attended by congressman Tom DeLay and others. Ridenour was called to testify on this matter before the Senate Indian Affairs Committee on June 22, 2005.

Records showed that Abramoff directed one of his clients to donate to the NCPPR; the NCPPR then paid an equivalent amount to provide most of the funding for the golf trip, which was described in required House filing paperwork as for "educational purposes". Two months after the trip, DeLay voted against legislation opposed by the client. DeLay and Ridenour have both defended the propriety of the arrangement, asserting that the donation was in no way connected to the trip, nor were the donation or the trip connected to the vote.

DeLay was admonished three times last year by the House ethics committee for infringing rules governing lawmakers' activities and their contacts with registered lobbyists. House ethics rules bar the payment by lobbyists for any lawmaker's travel-connected entertainment and recreational activities costing more than $50; they also require that lawmakers accurately report the sponsor of their trips and the full cost.

In an article last month about the same trip by DeLay, The Post reported that an Indian tribe and a gambling services company made donations to the National Center for Public Policy Research that covered most of the expenses declared by participants at that time. The article also said these payments were made two months before DeLay voted against legislation opposed by the tribe and the company. DeLay has said the vote was unrelated to the payments.

The article also reported that Abramoff submitted an expense voucher to Preston Gates seeking a reimbursement of $12,789.73 to cover expenses for meals, hotels and transportation during the London and Scotland trip incurred by DeLay; his wife, Christine; and his two aides.

The new receipts add more detail about these expenses, make clear that the total expenses for all of the participants were at least $50,000 more than was previously known, and connect Abramoff directly to the payment of some charges.

Ridenour also attended the 1997 DeLay-Abramoff trip to Russia funded through NCPPR by the Russian energy giant Naftasib.

References

Further reading
 Easton, Nina J. (2000), Gang of Five. Simon & Schuster. .
 "Statement of Amy Moritz Ridenour", before Senate Indian Affairs Committee Hearing on Lobbying practices Involving Indian Tribes, June 22, 2005.

External linaks
NCPPR staff bio

1959 births
2017 deaths
College Republicans
American activists
Washington, D.C., Republicans